Naseer Ahmed (born 14 June 1972) is a Pakistani wrestler. He competed in the men's freestyle 57 kg at the 1992 Summer Olympics.

References

External links

1972 births
Living people
Pakistani male sport wrestlers
Olympic wrestlers of Pakistan
Wrestlers at the 1992 Summer Olympics
Place of birth missing (living people)
20th-century Pakistani people